Tricks, is a 2007 Polish film  written, directed and produced by Andrzej Jakimowski starring Damian Ul, Ewelina Walendziak and Tomasz Sapryk. Tricks is Andrzej Jakimowski's follow up to Squint Your Eyes, his 2002 debut.

Plot
A charming bittersweet narrative unfolds from director Andrzej Jakimowski. This is the story of siblings Stefek, 6, and Elka, 18, along with Elka's car mechanic boyfriend Jerzy during one sun-drenched summer. The siblings live with their mother who is a shopkeeper. Their father has left their mother for another woman, unaware of Stefek's existence. After a chance encounter at the local railway station, and despite a denial by his sister that this was his father, Stefek decides to challenge fate to engineer another meeting. He believes that the chain of events he sets in motion will help him get closer to his father who abandoned his mother. His sister Elka teaches him how to bribe fate with small sacrifices. Tricks played, coupled with a number of coincidences eventually bring the father to the mother's shop but the long-awaited reunion does not immediately materialise as expected. As a last chance, Stefak tries his good luck with the riskiest of his tricks.

Cast
Damian Ul as Stefek
Ewelina Walendziak as Elka
Tomasz Sapryk as Father of Stefek and Elka
Rafal Guzniczak as Jerzy
Iwona Fornalczyk as Mother of Stefek and Elka
Joanna Liszowska as Violka
Andrzej Golejewski as Homeless
Grzegorz Stelmaszewski as Turek
Simeone Matarelli as Leone

Distribution and response

Tricks received a warm reception from the audience at the Venice Film Festival whilst at the same time gaining critics' approval. Iain Millar from the American channel Bloomberg wrote in his review: "The success of Sztuczki is due mostly to the incredible intuition of Jakimowski as a director. Although not nominated for the bigger awards, Tricks received attention from many film festivals. The film was chosen as Poland's official submission to the 81st Academy Awards for Best Foreign Language Film.

Awards

Polish Film Festival
Best Cinematography - Adam Bajerski
Golden Lion - Andrzej Jakimowski
São Paulo International Film Festival
Special Jury Award - Andrzej Jakimowski
Tokyo International Film Festival
Best Actor Award - Damian Ul
Venice Film Festival
Label Europa Cinemas - Andrzej Jakimowski
Laterna Magica Prize - Andrzej Jakimowski

Nominations

São Paulo International Film Festival
International Jury Award - Andrzej Jakimowski
Tokyo International Film Festival
Tokyo Grand Prix - Andrzej Jakimowski

See also

 The Railway Children - 1970 film

References

External links
 
 
  (currently broken, 20 September 2009)

2007 films
Polish comedy-drama films